Eerikukivi is a glacial erratic on the island of Aegna. Its coordinates are: .

Conservation 
On 1 January 1992, the boulder was declared a Protected Natural Monument by the Estonian government. It is classed as Category III within the IUCN Management Category. The Class III designation is reserved for natural monuments that are "protected areas managed mainly for conservation of specific natural features". Or, "areas containing one, or more, specific natural or natural/cultural features which is of outstanding or unique value because of its inherent rarity, representative or aesthetic qualities or cultural significance."

References

External links
 Keskkonnaregistri avalik teenus (in Estonian)

Glacial erratics of Estonia
Kesklinn, Tallinn